André Lysenstøen (born 27 October 1988 in Oslo, Norway) is a Norwegian professional ice hockey goaltender. He currently plays with HeKi of Finland's second-level Mestis league. Lysenstøen has previously played with the Lillehammer IK organization from 2004 to 2007. He played for the organization's junior team, as well as making appearances with the elite team. Beginning in 2007–08 he played primarily for the Stavanger Oilers top-level team.

Lysenstøen was selected to play for the Norway men's national ice hockey team at the 2010 Winter Olympics. He has previously represented Norway at the 2006 IIHF World U18 Championships, the 2007 and World Junior Championships, and the 2008 and World Championships.

External links
 

1988 births
Norwegian ice hockey goaltenders
Ice hockey players at the 2010 Winter Olympics
Lillehammer IK players
Living people
Norwegian expatriate ice hockey people
Olympic ice hockey players of Norway
Ice hockey people from Oslo
Stavanger Oilers players